Larus is a large genus of gulls with worldwide distribution

Larus or Lárus may also refer to:

 Larus, ancient Cantabrian mercenary
 Lárus Guðmundsson, Icelandic professional footballer
 Lárus Sigurðsson, Icelandic former professional footballer
 James Larus, American computer scientist

See also
 Larusso (disambiguation)